Dolenje Mokro Polje is a settlement in the Municipality of Šentjernej in southeastern Slovenia. The area is part of the traditional region of Lower Carniola. It is now included in the Southeast Slovenia Statistical Region.
The village was first mentioned in 1227 as Unter Nassenfeld (literally, 'lower wet field'). Due to flooding, the villagers began to settle at a nearby location, where it still stands. Only a few ruins have survived at the old location. According to the 2003 census, there are 36 houses in the village. Villagers attend Saint Sigismund's Church in the neighboring village of Polhovica.

References

External links

Dolenje Mokro Polje on Geopedia

Populated places in the Municipality of Šentjernej